William Paul Joseph McCrossan (born May 20, 1942) is a Canadian actuary and former Member of Parliament.

Background
McCrossan was born in Toronto. An actuary by profession, McCrossan has served as president of the Canadian Institute of Actuaries. He was employed by Canada Life Assurance prior to being elected to the House of Commons.

Politics
He represented the riding of York—Scarborough as a Progressive Conservative from 1978, when he was elected in a by-election until his defeat in the 1980 general election. As an MP, he introduced a private member's bill, Bill C-255, the Public Pensions Reporting Act, which passed unanimously. He also supported the passage of the Non-smokers' Rights Act, which was introduced by a New Democratic Party member of parliament, Lynn McDonald.

He was re-elected in the 1984 election, but lost to Liberal Jim Karygiannis in the redistributed riding of Scarborough—Agincourt in the 1988 election.

He attempted to return to politics in the riding of Scarborough East in the 2000 federal election but was defeated.

Later life
From 1995 to 1996, he was president of the International Actuarial Association. In 2001, he was named to the Standards Advisory Council of the International Accounting Standards Committee. He was a consulting actuary and partner at Eckler Partners Ltd., now known as Eckler Ltd. He served on the advisory committee for Sir Derek Morris's review of the actuarial profession in the United Kingdom, known as the Morris Review.

In 2010, McCrossan was named to the New Brunswick Task Force on Protecting Pensions.

Electoral record

References

External links
 

1942 births
Canadian actuaries
Canadian people of Irish descent
Living people
Members of the House of Commons of Canada from Ontario
Politicians from Toronto
Progressive Conservative Party of Canada MPs